Elisa Sednaoui (born December 14, 1987) is a model, actress, philanthropist and film director of Syrian, Italian, Egyptian, and French descent.  She has appeared in such films as Eastern Drift, La Baie du renard, Bus Palladium, Les Gamins, and Remember Now, as well as in fashion campaigns for Chanel Eyewear, Giorgio Armani, Missoni and Roberto Cavalli. In 2013, she created the Elisa Sednaoui Foundation, dedicated to promoting creative learning, after-school initiatives for youngsters.

Family and early life
Elisa Sednaoui was born in Bra, Piedmont, Italy and raised between three countries, Egypt, Italy, and France. She spent much of her early life in Luxor and Zamalek, Cairo. Her mother is of Italian heritage, while her father has Syrian-Egyptian and French roots. The Sednaoui family, a Melkite Greek Catholic family of Syrian descent, finds its roots in the city of Sednaya, from where their surname originates. The Sednaoui family migrated to Egypt at the end of the 19th century and developed successful department stores in Cairo.

Film
Sednaoui’s first feature film, Šarūnas Bartas’ Eastern Drift was released in Paris in December 2010.  She played the lead female role of "Gabriella", alongside Bartas. The film was shown at La Berlinale 2010 – section “The International Forum of New Cinema.”  In La Baie du Renard, a short film selected to close Critics Week (Semaine de la Critique) at Cannes Film Festival 2009, Sednaoui starred alongside Pierre Torreton 

She was recently seen on French screens in Christopher Thompson's first feature film Bus Palladium, co-starring with Marc André Grondin and Arthur Dupont. Sednaoui also starred opposite French actor Pascal Greggory in Karl Lagerfeld’s short film Remember Now, the introduction to the 2010 Chanel Cruise Collection.

Sednaoui has also appeared in Love Lasts Three Years, released by Europa in January 2012,
 and The Legend of Kaspar Hauser, a surrealistic adaptation of the 19th century Teutonic foundling story transposed to Sardinia.

Directorial work
Sednaoui co-directed with Martina Gili the documentary Kullu Tamam (Everything is Good). The film showcases Egyptians not covered by mainstream media by telling the stories of characters who, despite their differences of age and belief, share the sudden discovery of what is usually referred to as “freedom of expression”. The film depicts the  countryside of Luxor.

Selected filmography

Nonprofit
In 2013, Sednaoui created the Elisa Sednaoui Foundation, a nonprofit organization that promotes creative learning after-school programs for youngsters. The foundation's pilot program, a music workshop for youngsters in Luxor, Egypt, took place in April, 2014. During a full school-week, local youngsters attended the workshop (organized with the support of Makan—the Egyptian Center For Culture and Arts—and fellow NPO MIMA Music), which consisted in creative, game-like activities that helped them write and record a full song.

Fashion
In addition to film, Sednaoui has appeared in campaigns for Chanel Eyewear, Giorgio Armani and a Roberto Cavalli fragrance campaign in February 2012, shot by Steven Klein for print and Johan Renck for television. In December 2015 she collaborated with Oscar-winning director Paolo Sorrentino on his campaign for Missoni Fragrance. Before his death during February 2019, Sednaoui served as a muse to Karl Lagerfeld.

Sednaoui has been featured on the cover of magazines such as Glamour Italia, Vogue US, Italian Vogue, Vanity Fair, L’Officiel, Flair, Marie Claire and Elle, among others.

Personal life
Sednaoui married an Anglo-Sephardic gallerist, Alexander Dellal, on 3 May 2014. They have together two sons, Jack Zeitoun in 2013, and Samo in 2017.

Stéphane Sednaoui is her cousin.

See also
 Qasr el-Nil Street

References

Bibliography
search using Google, criteria "when Elisa Sednaoui was married"

External links

 

1987 births
Living people
French female models
French film actresses
French film directors
French women film directors
French people of Syrian descent
French people of Italian descent
Egyptian Melkite Greek Catholics
21st-century French actresses
IMG Models models